Dafen Tinplate Co Ltd v Llanelly Steel Co (1907) Ltd [1920] 2 Ch 124 is a UK company law case concerning amendment of the articles of association.

Facts
Dafen Tinplate Co Ltd was a shareholder in Llanelly Steel Co. Llanelly realised that Dafen were buying steel from an alternative source of supply, and also to buy up the company's shares (an attempt which failed). Llanelly responded by altering its articles through a special resolution to include a power to compulsorily purchase the shares of any member requested to transfer them. Dafen Tinplate argued the alteration was invalid.

Judgment
The court held that the alteration was too wide to be valid. The altered article would confer too much power on the majority. It went much further than was necessary for the protection of the company. The judge seemed to be using the bona fide for the benefit of the company test in an objective sense, that is, he was judging the situation from the courts point of view.

See also
Allen v Gold Reefs of West Africa Ltd [1900] 1 Ch 656
Brown v British Abrasive Wheel Co [1919] 1 Ch 290
Sidebottom v Kershaw, Leese & Co Ltd [1920] 1 Ch 154
Shuttleworth v Cox Bros and Co (Maidenhead) [1927] 1 Ch 154
Southern Foundries (1926) Ltd v Shirlaw [1940] AC 701
Greenhalgh v Arderne Cinemas Ltd [1951] Ch 286

Notes

United Kingdom company case law
High Court of Justice cases
1920 in case law
1920 in British law